In complex analysis, de Branges's theorem, or the Bieberbach conjecture, is a theorem that gives a necessary condition on a holomorphic function in order for it to map the open unit disk of the complex plane injectively to the complex plane.

That is, we consider a function defined on the open unit disk which is holomorphic  and injective (univalent) with Taylor series of the form

Such functions are called schlicht.  The theorem then states that

Schlicht functions

The normalizations

mean that

This can always be obtained by an affine transformation: starting with an arbitrary injective holomorphic function  defined on the open unit disk and setting

Such functions  are of  interest because they appear in the  Riemann mapping theorem.

A  family of schlicht functions are the rotated Koebe functions

with  a complex number of absolute value .
, then  is a rotated Koebe function.

The condition of de Branges' theorem is not sufficient to show the function is schlicht, as the function

shows: it is holomorphic on the unit disc and satisfies  for all , but it is not injective since
.

History 
A survey of the history is given by Koepf (2007).

 proved , and stated the conjecture that .  and   independently proved the conjecture for starlike functions.
Then Charles Loewner proved , using the Löwner equation. His work was used by most later attempts, and is also applied in the theory of Schramm–Loewner evolution.

 proved that  for all , showing that the Bieberbach conjecture is true up to a factor of  Several authors later reduced the constant in the inequality below .
 
If  is a schlicht function then  is an odd schlicht function. 
 showed that its Taylor coefficients  satisfy  for all .

The Robertson conjecture states that if

is an odd schlicht function in the unit disk with  then for all positive integers , 

This conjecture introduced the key idea of bounding various quadratic functions of the coefficients rather than the coefficients themselves, which is equivalent to bounding norms of elements in certain Hilbert spaces of schlicht functions.

 proved that the limit of  exists, and has absolute value less than  unless  is a Koebe function. In particular this showed that for any  there can be at most a finite number of exceptions to the Bieberbach conjecture.

The Milin conjecture states that for each schlicht function on the unit disk, and for all positive integers , 

  
 showed using the Lebedev–Milin inequality that the Milin conjecture (later proved by de Branges) implies the Robertson conjecture and therefore the Bieberbach conjecture.

Finally  proved  for all .

De Branges's proof
The proof uses a type of Hilbert space of entire functions. The study of these spaces grew into a sub-field of complex analysis and the spaces have come to be called de Branges spaces. De Branges  proved the stronger  Milin conjecture  on logarithmic coefficients. This was already known to imply the Robertson conjecture  about odd univalent functions,  which in turn was known to imply  the Bieberbach conjecture about schlicht functions . His proof uses the Loewner equation, the Askey–Gasper inequality about Jacobi polynomials, and  the Lebedev–Milin inequality on exponentiated power series.

De Branges reduced the conjecture to some inequalities for Jacobi polynomials, and verified the first few by hand. Walter Gautschi verified more of these inequalities by computer for de Branges (proving the Bieberbach conjecture for the first 30 or so coefficients) and then asked Richard Askey whether he knew of any similar inequalities. Askey pointed out that  had proved the necessary inequalities eight years before, which allowed de Branges to complete his proof. The first version was very long and had some minor mistakes which caused some skepticism about it, but these were corrected with the help of members of the Leningrad seminar on Geometric Function Theory (Leningrad Department of Steklov Mathematical Institute) when de Branges visited in 1984.

De Branges proved the following result, which for  implies the Milin conjecture (and therefore the Bieberbach conjecture). 

is non-negative, non-increasing, and has limit . Then for all Riemann mapping functions  univalent in the unit disk with

the maximinum value of 

is achieved by the Koebe function .

A simplified version of the proof was published in 1985 by Carl FitzGerald and Christian Pommerenke, and an even shorter description by Jacob Korevaar.

See also 
Grunsky matrix
Fekete–Szegő inequality
Schwarz lemma

References

 

 

.

 Koepf, Wolfram (2007), Bieberbach’s Conjecture, the de Branges and Weinstein Functions and the Askey-Gasper Inequality    

 (Translation of the 1971 Russian edition)

Further reading 

Theorems in complex analysis
Conjectures
Conjectures that have been proved